The Engineering School of  the University of Caen Normandy (in French: ESIX Normandie, before EIC - École d'Ingénieurs de Cherbourg) is a French engineering university funded in 1993.

It is situated in Normandy in two cities: Caen and Cherbourg.

The school is accredited by the "Commission des titres d'ingénieur" to deliver Engineering Degrees.

Teaching 
The school has three departments:
 Food Sciences
 Industrial Systems Engineering (industrial production or nuclear operations) 
 Mecatronics

International relations 
The school has agreements allowing students to attend semester(s) in foreign countries:
In Austria:
Fachhochschule Vorarlberg University of Applied Sciences - Department of Mechatronics
In Sweden:
Linköping Institute of Technology - Department of Manufacturing Management
Royal Institute of Technology, KTH Stockholm - Department of Production Engineering
In Finland:
Tampere University of Technology

External links 
Official website

Engineering universities and colleges in France
Universities in Normandy
Educational institutions established in 1993
1993 establishments in France